Kenneth Jay Levy (26 February 1927 – 15 August 2013) was an American musicologist who specialized in Medieval, Renaissance and Byzantine music. He was described as "among the world’s authorities on early Christian and Byzantine music".

Life and career
Kenneth Jay Levy was born on 26 February 1927 in New York, New York. After service in World War II, Levy attended Queens College, City University of New York, and received a Bachelor of Arts in 1947, having studied music history under Curt Sachs and music theory under the composer Karol Rathaus. He received both a Master of Fine Arts and PhD at Princeton University, studying under Oliver Strunk and Erich Hertzmann. After a brief stint teaching at Princeton from 1952 to 1954, Levy taught at Brandeis University for over a decade. In 1966 he returned to Princeton, teaching there until his retirement in 1995. Levy died on 15 August 2013 in Skillman, New Jersey, US. Following his death, the American Institute of Musicology set up the 'Kenneth Levy Fund' to fund studies relating to medieval music.

Levy specialized in a variety of topics concerning Medieval, Renaissance and Byzantine music. In particular, an obituary from Princeton described him as "among the world’s authorities on early Christian and Byzantine music". In Grove Music Online, Paula Higgins notes that he "investigated Byzantine and Western chant, including the Old Roman, Ambrosian, Beneventan and Ravennate repertories, and by careful comparison he has been able to draw tentative conclusions regarding the relationships of certain Western chants to Byzantine models and between modal patterns and performing practices common to East and West." He also wrote on the chanson in the 16th century.

Selected bibliography

References

1927 births
2013 deaths
20th-century musicologists
21st-century musicologists